Makes Me Wanna Holler: A Young Black Man in America (1994) is an autobiographical and debut book by Nathan McCall.

In an April 2014 interview with Ebony magazine, Nathan McCall stated that he was amazed that Makes Me Wanna Holler was still selling 20 years after it was originally published.

References

External links
Makes Me Wanna Holler at Random House

1994 non-fiction books
Debut books
English-language books
Memoirs of imprisonment
African-American autobiographies